Rioch may refer to:

 Ríoch, 5th-century Irish missionary and saint
Bruce Rioch born  1947), Scottish is a football manager and former player
David Rioch (1900–1985), American psychiatrist and neuroanatomist
Gregor Rioch (born 1975), English former footballer
Neil Rioch (born 1951), English former professional footballer 
Margaret Rioch (1907–1996), American psychotherapist